Roger Lewis (born 26 February 1960) is a Welsh academic, biographer and journalist.

Biography 
Lewis was raised in Bedwas, Monmouthshire, and educated at Bassaleg School in Newport. He then attended the University of St Andrews, graduating MA, then Magdalen College, Oxford, where he gained the MLitt degree, both with first class honours. He became a Fellow of Wolfson College, Oxford, in 1984.

Lewis has written biographies of Peter Sellers (1994), Charles Hawtrey (2001), Anthony Burgess (2003), and Laurence Olivier (2007). His book on Sellers was dramatized by HBO as The Life and Death of Peter Sellers, which won a Golden Globe Award and was nominated for the Palme d'Or at the 2004 Cannes Film Festival.

Personal life
Lewis is married, with children, and lives in Hastings, with a holiday apartment in Bad Ischl, Austria. He is a lover of good art and bullfighting.

Controversies 
Writing a book review for the Daily Mail in August 2011, Lewis expressed a dislike of the Welsh language, calling it an "appalling and moribund monkey language". Plaid Cymru politician Jonathan Edwards reported Lewis's comments to the police and to the Press Complaints Commission.

In 2014 comments about lesbians Lewis made in a Spectator article led to publishers Biteback Publishing withdrawing an offer of a book deal.

Books

References

External links

 www.telegraph.co.uk

1960 births
Living people
People from Newport, Wales
People from Caerphilly
People educated at Bassaleg School
Alumni of the University of St Andrews
Alumni of Magdalen College, Oxford
Fellows of Wolfson College, Oxford
Welsh scholars and academics
Welsh biographers
Welsh journalists
Daily Mail journalists